Bogić Bogićević (born 15 May 1953) is a Bosnian politician. He served as the 5th Bosnian member of the Yugoslav Presidency from 1989 until its abolishment in 1992.

Bogićević was also a member of the national House of Representatives and was the 2nd President of the Olympic Committee of Bosnia and Herzegovina as well.

Early and personal life
Bogićević was born into an ethnic Serb family in the Eastern Bosnian town of Ugljevik. He is married and is a father of two children.

Presidency of Yugoslavia (1989–1992)
Bogićević was elected member of the Presidency of Yugoslavia by a referendum of the citizens of Bosnia and Herzegovina on 25 June 1989, among five candidates, thus becoming the first democratically elected member of the collective Yugoslav Presidency. In addition, he served as President of Yugoslavia's Federal Council for the Protection of the Constitutional Order.

On 12 March 1991, Bogićević famously defied fellow Presidency members from Serbia on a vote which would have imposed martial law in Yugoslavia. Formally, the military leadership proposed raising combat readiness, but the real goal was to introduce military rule in Slovenia and Croatia and to overthrow the new political leaderships of Kiro Gligorov in Macedonia and of Alija Izetbegović in his native Bosnia and Herzegovina. The pro-Milošević faction, which already controlled the Presidency votes from Serbia (with Vojvodina and Kosovo as separate seats in the Presidency), and Montenegro, counted on his vote as a fellow Serb. Bogićević rejected the proposal, and thus by one vote, the Yugoslav Presidency rejected the imposition of martial law. He reportedly commented on his vote, which historians deemed "fateful": "I am a Serb, but not by profession". His decision was decried by the Serb Democratic Party, who claimed that Bogićević did not represent the Serbs, and he was deprived of his presidential salary as a punishment. He later started working for the Social Democratic Party. 

Together with Macedonian Presidency member Vasil Tupurkovski, in July 1991, Bogićević mediated negotiations between the Slovenian government and the Yugoslav People's Army (JNA) Supreme Command on the release of recruits and the unblocking of barracks during the Ten-Day War between the Slovenian Territorial Defence and the JNA.

Bogićević spent the wartime period between 1992 to 1995 in Sarajevo under siege.

Post-war career
In post-war Bosnia and Herzegovina, Bogićević was a member of the national House of Representatives of the Parliamentary Assembly of Bosnia and Herzegovina, and vice president of the Social Democratic Party (SDP BiH). Bogićević was also president of the Olympic Committee of Bosnia and Herzegovina. A poll conducted by the Dani newspaper in 1998 to survey the population of Sarajevo, Banja Luka and West Mostar found that Bogićević was among the most popular politicians in West Mostar and Sarajevo. In 2003, he founded the consulting company Fides, dealing with market research. 

On 20 November 2020, Bogićević announced he would accept the appointment as mayor of Sarajevo by the four-party liberal coalition set to govern the City Council after the 2020 Bosnian municipal elections, which includes the SDP BiH. However, on 24 March 2021, he decided to pull out of the candidacy because of conflicts in the coalition. Ultimately, with Bogićević pulling out, the SDP BiH nominated Benjamina Karić for the post on 5 April 2021, getting unanimously elected by members of the City Council three days later on 8 April, and became the 39th mayor of the city, replacing Abdulah Skaka, becoming only the second female in that office (the first being Semiha Borovac from 2005 to 2009).

Honours

Awards
In 1999, Bogićević received the Plaque of Humanism, an award given by the Permanent Committee of the International League of Humanists.
In 2006, the International Centre for Peace Sarajevo awarded him with the traditional award "Freedom".

Orders

Honorary citizenship

References

External links

N1 Pressing: Bogić Bogićević 

1953 births
Living people
People from Ugljevik
Serbs of Bosnia and Herzegovina
Academic staff of the University of Sarajevo
Social Democratic Party of Bosnia and Herzegovina politicians
Members of the House of Representatives (Bosnia and Herzegovina)